Portstewart is a small town in County Londonderry, Northern Ireland. It had a population of 8,003 people in the 2011 Census. It is a seaside resort neighbouring Portrush. Its harbour and scenic coastal paths form an Atlantic promenade leading to a two-miles beach (Portstewart Strand), popular with holidaymakers in summer and surfers year-round.

Profile
Portstewart was a popular holiday destination for Victorian middle-class families. Its long, crescent-shaped seafront promenade is sheltered by rocky headlands. It is a reasonably prosperous town. Most of the town is contained in the Strand electoral ward and this is one of the most affluent areas in Northern Ireland. In a deprivation index of electoral wards in Northern Ireland the Strand Ward in the town was ranked 570th out of the 582 wards.

House prices in Portstewart have been amongst the highest in Northern Ireland. According to the University of Ulster Quarterly House Price Index report produced in partnership with Bank of Ireland and the Northern Ireland Housing Executive in Q4 2010, the North Coast region (Coleraine/Limavady area) had higher property prices than those of affluent south Belfast.

Portstewart is one of the most integrated towns in Northern Ireland with the religious demographics similar to the population of Northern Ireland as a whole. Community relations are generally good within the town. Dominican College, a Catholic grammar school, is one of the main schools in the area.

History

Portstewart was founded in 1792 by John Cromie, who named it after his maternal ancestors, the Stewarts of Ballylesse. A Lieutenant Stewart is said to have obtained a lease of land from The 5th Earl of Antrim (first creation; 1713-1775) in 1734. The name Port na Binne Uaine is still used today alongside the Gaelicised version Port Stíobhaird.

Portstewart developed to a modest size seaside resort in the mid 19th century under the influence of a local landlord, John Cromie. Its development and character was influenced greatly by the Sabbatarian sensitivities of the Cromies and the consequent resistance to a railway connection in the mid 19th century.

Places of interest

Portstewart has a Dominican convent (an imposing Gothic mansion) with the attached Dominican College sitting on the edge of a cliff which dominates the western end of the Promenade. The site, formally known as "O'Hara's Castle" was built in 1834 and bought by the Dominican order in 1917 to be a centre of education in the north west of Ireland.
Just west of the town stretches Portstewart Strand, a clean two-mile long blue flag beach, protected by the National Trust.
Beneath the convent is a cliff path which stretches along the coast from the Promenade to Portstewart Strand. From here it is a popular walk to the Barmouth, where the Bann flows out into the Atlantic Ocean. The cliff path has panoramic views across the Strand and Downhill with Donegal in the background.
Portstewart Town Hall was completed in 1934.

Transport
The nearest stations are Portrush and Coleraine with Northern Ireland Railways providing connections west to Castlerock and Londonderry railway station and east to Belfast Lanyon Place railway station and Belfast Great Victoria Street railway station. Ulsterbus provide connections to the trains at Coleraine railway station.

Sport
The town is home to three golf courses (under one club – Portstewart Golf Club), made lively by the forceful Atlantic wind. Portstewart has one of the few 54-hole complexes in Europe. The championship links Strand course is set amidst imposing sand dunes with panoramic views across the Atlantic mouth of Lough Foyle to the Inishowen peninsula beyond. The Strand Course hosted the Dubai Duty Free Irish Open in 2017 for the first time in the club's history and was the biggest event staged in the town ever attracting crowds of 92,000+.
Portstewart F.C. are an intermediate football club playing in the NIFL Premier Intermediate League.
 Every May, the North West 200 motorcycle race passes through the town, with the starting grid and pit area on the coastal road between Portrush and Portstewart. The circuit between the towns of Portrush, Portstewart and Coleraine is one of the fastest in the world, with top speeds exceeding 200 mph on public roads. It is one of the last such classic races held in Europe. Drawing crowds of over 150,000, it is the largest outdoor sporting event in Ireland.
CLG Eoghan Rua, Coleraine, is the local Gaelic Athletic Association club and the playing grounds are just outside Portstewart.
Portstewart also hosts matches in the Super Cup NI.

People

 Field Marshal Sir George White, VC (1835-1912) - commanded the garrison at the Siege of Ladysmith during the Second Boer War, was born at Low Rock Castle.
 Jimmy Kennedy (1902-1984) - song writer;  inspired by one of the town's sunsets when he wrote "Red Sails in the Sunset". He was born in Omagh but grew up in Portstewart.
 Harry Gregg (1932-2020) - former Northern Ireland footballer, used to own a hotel in the town.
 Sean Farren (born 1939) - Social Democratic and Labour Party politician and former member of the Northern Ireland Assembly, lives in Portstewart.
 Robert Anthony Welch (1946–2013) - author, academic and literary historian
 Henry McCullough (1943–2016) - guitarist.
 Harry Mullan (1946–1999), boxing writer.
 Billy Leonard (born 1955) - Sinn Féin politician and former member of the Northern Ireland Assembly; lives in Portstewart.
 Briana Corrigan (born 1965) - vocalist with The Beautiful South and the lead female vocalist on a number one single in 1990, "A Little Time". She grew up in Portstewart.
 Jimeoin (McKeown) (born 1966) - comedian.

Demography
On Census day (27 March 2011) there were 8,003 people living in Portstewart (3,338 households), accounting for 0.44% of the NI total. The Census 2011 population represented an increase of 2.6% on the Census 2001 figure of 7,803. Of the Census 2011 population:

 14.77% were aged under 16 years and 18.94% were aged 65 and over;
 52.73% of the usually resident population were female and 47.27% were male;
 56.98% belong to or were brought up in a 'Protestant and Other Christian (including Christian related)'faith and 35.54% belong to or were brought up in the Catholic Christian faith;
 51.56% indicated that they had a British national identity, 35.17% had a Northern Irish national identity and 22.15% had an Irish national identity (respondents could indicate more than one national identity);
 38 years was the average (median) age of the population;
 13.36% had some knowledge of Ulster-Scots and 9.90% had some knowledge of Irish (Gaelic).

Education

Dominican College, Portstewart
St. Colum's Primary School
Portstewart Primary School

See also
List of localities in Northern Ireland by population

References

Sources
Culture Northern Ireland

External links

 
Towns in County Londonderry
Seaside resorts in Northern Ireland
Port cities and towns in Northern Ireland
Ports and harbours of Northern Ireland